Marsh-Billings-Rockefeller National Historical Park is a United States National Historical Park in Woodstock, Vermont. The park preserves the Marsh-Billings House, as well as the site where Frederick Billings established a managed forest and a progressive dairy farm. The name honors Billings and the other owners of the property: George Perkins Marsh, Mary Montagu Billings French, Laurance Rockefeller, and Mary French Rockefeller. The Rockefellers transferred the property to the federal government in 1992. It is the only unit of the United States National Park System in Vermont (except for a portion of the Appalachian Trail). The park was honored in 2020 by being placed on Vermont's America the Beautiful quarter.

Features and facilities
Marsh-Billings-Rockefeller National Historical Park is located just northwest of Woodstock village, on the west side of Vermont Route 12.  Opposite it on the east side of the road stands Billings Farm & Museum, a working farm and heritage museum also on land originally belonging to the Billingses.  Parking for both properties is located on the east side of VT 12, and National Park Service staff attend visitors at both the farm's visitor center, and one located on the park property.  The area nearest the road is a landscaped area featuring the George Perkins Marsh Boyhood Home, the architectural centerpiece of the park and a National Historic Landmark.  Although it was built in 1805, it underwent major alterations under Frederick Billings to achieve its present Late Victorian splendor.  Visitors can take guided tours of the house (reservations recommended due to limited availability), which include displays of landscape paintings, including a significant collection of Hudson River School artists, highlighting the influence painting and photography had on the conservation movement.  The gardens have also been restored.

A pond is located near the center of the high valley, and there are several scenic viewpoints accessible from the trails. The property extends westward all the way to Prosper Road, where trailhead access is also provided to the western portions of the park.

History
Charles Marsh, a prominent Vermont lawyer, built the core of the main house in 1805, as a fairly typical two-story five-bay Federal style house, and it is where he raised his family.  His son George Perkins Marsh was born elsewhere in Woodstock in 1801, and grew up here before leaving for Dartmouth College when he was sixteen.  The younger Marsh followed his father into both law and politics, winning election to Congress in 1834 as a Whig, and gaining appointment to diplomatic posts by Presidents John Tyler and Abraham Lincoln.  Between the 1830s and 1860s he developed a philosophy of land stewardship which laid the foundation for the conservation movement in the United States with the 1864 publication of Man and Nature, or the Physical Geography as Modified by Human Behavior.  This work, updated in 1874, gave a historical assessment of the decline of earlier societies because of a lack of stewardship, and made substantive calls for remedial actions to preserve the natural environment.  Marsh died in 1882, never seeing his ideas fully realized.

The Marsh estate, then , was purchased in 1869 by Frederick H. Billings, a native of Royalton, Vermont who made a fortune as a lawyer dealing with land claims during the California Gold Rush, and was one of the founding partners of the Northern Pacific Railroad, serving as its president from 1873 to 1881.  Between 1869 and 1881 Billings commissioned two significant enlargements and alterations to the house, the first adding a wing and a mansard roof, and the second, designed by Henry Hudson Holley, fully transforming the building into the elaborate Queen Anne Victorian it is today.  Billings established what he considered to be a model farm on the property, which is now the adjacent Billings & Farm museum.

The next major owners of the property were Mary French Rockefeller (Billings' granddaughter) and her husband Laurance Rockefeller.  The latter, an influential conservation advisor to several United States presidents, donated the house and upland properties to the people of the United States in 1992, the year the park was established.  The house and a surrounding  of land were designated a National Historic Landmark and listed on the National Register of Historic Places in 1967 for their association with Marsh and Billings, and for the house's architecture, which was judged a particularly fine and imposing example of Queen Anne architecture.

Awards
Marsh-Billings-Rockefeller National Historical Park was awarded the first Forest Stewardship Council (FSC) certification of a United States national park by the Rainforest Alliance's SmartWood program in August 2005. This certification made Marsh-Billings-Rockefeller only the second United States federal land to receive such certification for sustainable forest management.

See also
First Congregational Church of Woodstock, Vermont
F. H. Gillingham & Sons
Franklin S. Billings
Frederick H. Billings
Laurance Rockefeller
National Register of Historic Places listings in Windsor County, Vermont
Woodstock, Vermont

References

External links
 
Marsh-Billings-Rockefeller NHP official site
Encyclopedia article with bibliography

National Historical Parks of the United States
Houses on the National Register of Historic Places in Vermont
Historic American Engineering Record in Vermont
Historic American Landscapes Survey in Vermont
Woodstock, Vermont
Protected areas established in 1992
National Park Service areas in Vermont
Protected areas of Windsor County, Vermont
Museums in Windsor County, Vermont
Historic house museums in Vermont
Houses in Windsor County, Vermont
George Perkins Marsh
1992 establishments in Vermont
National Register of Historic Places in Windsor County, Vermont
Parks on the National Register of Historic Places in Vermont